Carl Bialik is an American journalist and YouGov America's vice president of data science and U.S. politics editor. Earlier, Bialik was known for his work for The Wall Street Journal. In 2013, Bialik was hired by Nate Silver at FiveThirtyEight.com. In 2017 he was named data science editor of Yelp, working on Yelpblog.

Career
At the Wall Street Journal, Bialik was the creator and writer of the weekly Numbers Guy column, about the use and (particularly) misuse of numbers and statistics in the news and advocacy. It launched in 2005.

He was also the co-writer on the Journal's blog-like Daily Fix column, which billed itself as "a daily look at the best sportswriting on the Web."

His regular column at Gelf, which skewed toward a meta-journalism focus, was Blurb Racket, which pulled back the curtains on the critic quotes in movie and book advertisements, mainly by comparing them directly with the reviews they come from.

He is also the host of the tennis podcast "Thirty Love," in which he interviews various figures from the world of professional tennis including players, coaches, executives, and journalists. Bialik is also a recurring guest on the data-driven tennis podcast, "The Tennis Abstract Podcast."

He has also written for The Monitor (Uganda), Media Life Magazine, Yale Alumni Magazine, Arabies Trends, Sports Illustrated, The Yale Herald, Yale Scientific Magazine, CareerBuilder, and Student.com, and has published 5 scientific papers .

At FiveThirtyEight, Bialik wrote on a wide range of subjects, ranging from politics to economics to crime and to sports.

Background
He is a graduate of Yale University and the Bronx High School of Science. He is a New York City native.

References

The Bronx High School of Science alumni
Living people
Yale University alumni
American male journalists
Year of birth missing (living people)
Journalists from New York City